The 1952 Central Michigan Chippewas football team represented Central Michigan College of Education, renamed Central Michigan University in 1959, in the Interstate Intercollegiate Athletic Conference (IIAC) during the 1952 college football season. In their second season under head coach Kenneth Kelly, the Chippewas compiled a 7–2 record (6–0 against IIAC opponents), won the IIAC championship, and outscored all opponents by a combined total of 285 to 85.

The team's statistical leaders included quarterback Don Koleber with 417 passing yards, fullback Vern Hawes with 540 rushing yards, and Al Droth with 302 receiving yards. Guard Loren Dietrich received the team's most valuable player award. Eight Central Michigan players (Dietrich, Hawes, center Bill Banaszak, tackle Ken Barron, halfback Dave Clark, halfback Bill Doser, guard Marty Klozik, and halfback Chuck Miller) received first-team honors on the All-IIAC team.

Schedule

References

Central Michigan
Central Michigan Chippewas football seasons
Interstate Intercollegiate Athletic Conference football champion seasons
Central Michigan Chippewas football